Kukma or Kookma is a village near the Bhuj town, taluka in Kachchh District of Indian State of Gujarat. It is located at a distance of 16 kilometers from Bhuj, the headquarters of Kachchh District.

History

About the history of Kukma, it is one of the 19 villages established by Kutch Gurjar Kshatriyas or Mistris. These Mistris first moved to the Saurashtra in the early 7th century and later a major group entered Kutch in the 12th century and established themselves at Dhaneti. Later from the 12th century onwards they settled between Anjar and Bhuj and founded the villages of Anjar, Sinugra, Khambhra, Nagalpar, Khedoi, Madhapar, Hajapar, Kukma, Galpadar, Reha, Vidi, Ratnal, Jambudi, Devaliya, Lovaria, Nagor, Chandiya, Meghpar and Kumbharia. Most of the early infrastructure, temples, community halls, school, girls boarding house and old houses are built by this community during the late 19th century.

 However, majority of old houses with unique architect were destroyed in the earthquake of 26 January 2001.

Temples 

Kuldevi Temples of many clans of these Kutch Gurjar Kshatriya community are also there in this village. To mention, Kuldevi temple of Parmar clan of Momai mataji, Kuldevi temple of Chauhan clan of Brahmani Mata, Kuldevi temple of Rathod clan of Chaval Mataji have their temple in village. Also Nivruti Ashram and Garibdash ji Bhojanalaya are located in Kukma. Also there is Thakore Mandir in main square and Mahadev temple both built originally by KGK Community.Also Tank clan and Gohil clan have kuldevi temples in the  village.

Railway Station

Kukma also is a Railway Station (Flag Station) under Western Railways about 10 km from Bhuj on Gandhidham - Bhuj broad gauge route.  Kutch Express and New Bhuj Exp(Sayaji Exp.) Railway train runs daily on this route.

Present Status

At present, villagers are quiet prosperous.  Apart from Kutch Gurjar Kshatriyas, Ahirs, Lohana and other communities also have notable presence.  There is enough penetration of Telephone and all houses have electricity and water supply. There is also a big pond in outskirts of village, originally built by Mistri community, who founded the village.
People are involved in agriculture and other business. Parle Products has a Biscuit factory nearby and many are working in that factory. Besides Bhuj is also nearby and many go there for jobs and business.
Kukma do have Primary health center, Primary  school and High School.

References 

Villages in Kutch district